Souk El Ouzar is one of the souks of the medina of Tunis, specialized in selling blankets.

Location 
It is located in the north-east of Al-Zaytuna Mosque, near Souk El Attarine.

Monuments 
The souk has many monuments like Eshobak mosque and El Habibi Mosque that was built by the husainid ruler Muhammad VI al-Habib.

Notes and references 

Ouzar